Severnoye is a rural locality (a selo) and the administrative center of Severny Selsoviet of Arkharinsky District, Amur Oblast, Russia. The population was 178 as of 2018. There are 6 streets.

Geography 
Severnoye is located near the left bank of the Bureya River, 56 km west of Arkhara (the district's administrative centre) by road. Ukrainka is the nearest rural locality.

References 

Rural localities in Arkharinsky District